The Topeka Zoo (formally the Topeka Zoological Park) is a medium-sized zoo in Topeka, Kansas in the United States. It is located within Gage Park, just off I-70 in the north central portion of the city. Despite its size, it houses over 250 animals in a number of exhibits, including one of the first indoor tropical rain forests in the United States. It is one of the most popular attractions in Topeka, with over 250,000 visitors a year.

The Topeka Zoo is an accredited member of the Association of Zoos and Aquariums (AZA).

History

The Gage Family donated  to the city of Topeka in 1899 to use for a public park. Over the years, the park has accumulated playgrounds, a swimming pool, a fishing lake, a mini train, a rose garden, and a carousel.

The zoo was opened in the park in 1933. Additional exhibits were constructed over the years, and in 1963 the city hired its first zoo director, Gary K. Clarke. The first major facility at the zoo was constructed in 1966 to house large mammals. Clarke went on to get many of the current exhibits constructed, including Gorilla Encounter (1985), the temporary Koala Exhibit (1986), Lions Pride (1989), the Tropical Rainforest, and Discovering Apes.

The zoo lost its accreditation with the Association of Zoos and Aquariums in 2001, due to mismanagement, poor conditions for some of the animals being exhibited, and the deaths of several animals. In 2003, after a major overhaul of the zoo and the addition of several new exhibits, the Topeka Zoo regained its accreditation.

In 2011, the City hired a new zoo director by the name of Brendan Wiley. After this hire, the general demeanor of the citizens toward the zoo has been more positive.

Exhibits

Kansas Carnivores 
Kansas Carnivores, opened in 2009, features cougars and river otters in side-by-side exhibits.

Hill's Black Bear Woods 
Hill's Black Bear Woods was built in 1997, and features animals from North America. Units house Virginia opossum, eastern screech owl, and red-tailed hawk. Living in tall flight pens are golden eagles and eagle-owls. An exhibit nearby is home to pronghorns and wild turkeys, and another exhibit for striped skunks. Four American black bears live in a spacious enclosure with trees to climb. They can be viewed from an elevated walkway, or a ground level window.

Waterbird Lagoon 
Waterbird Lagoon features three ponds. Waterfowl such as trumpeter swans live in these ponds. Many wild waterfowl visit these ponds such as mallard ducks, wood ducks, and herons.

Jungle Cats 
The Jungle Cats exhibit features rare Sumatran tigers in thickly planted, side-by-side exhibits (one was previously home to a black-coated leopard). Both yards have water features. 3 Sumatran tigers cubs were born in May 2014.

Tropical Rainforest 
The Tropical Rainforest was the first indoor rainforest exhibit in the United States. Birds, such as scarlet macaws, Bali mynah, roseate spoonbills, and scarlet ibis, are free roaming, as well as Hoffmann's two-toed sloths, and Indian flying foxes. Individual exhibits house golden lion tamarins, three-banded armadillos, Cuvier's dwarf caimans, yellow-spotted river turtle, red-footed tortoises, and greater mouse-deer.

Animals and Man 
The Animals and Man building features exhibits for small animals, such as black-and-white ruffed lemurs and Cape porcupines. This building also serves as the indoor house for the zoo's hippopotamus, African and Asian elephants, and reticulated giraffes. They all have large outdoor yards, and the giraffes share theirs with East African crowned cranes.

Camp Cowabunga 
Formerly Lion's Pride, this exhibit has three lions in a spacious exhibit, painted dogs in an adjoining yard, and patas monkeys in an exhibit spanning the entrance to Camp Cowabunga, mixed with Kirk's dik-dik, African spurred tortoises, and helmeted guineafowl. The main feature is a central plaza where guests can view various artefacts from Africa, sit in a canoe used in the Zambezi, and view the animals from safari tents. In the future, this area will feature a viewing area into a couple of exhibits for giraffes, ostriches, crowned cranes, and species of antelopes.

Lianas Forest 
In the Lianas Forest (formerly Discovering Apes) building, Bornean orangutans live behind glass in an enclosure replicating the treetops in Borneo. They also have a spacious outdoor yard, meant to emulate Camp Leakey. The Treetop Conservation Center is now part of the building. A tunnel leads visitors through an outdoor enclosure which now houses Malayan sun bears that once housed western lowland gorillas.

Children's Zoo 
The Children's Zoo was added in 1992, and has domestic animals, such as sheep and goats to feed. There is a playground next to the Children's Zoo.

Adventure Trail 
Adventure Trail was added in 2015 and includes many family friendly experiences. The rainbow lorikeet aviary houses several colorful lorikeets that you can feed for a fee. A playground includes many climbing structures, a place to ride tricycles, and a mining sluice. The general store in this area also serves as a point to purchase snacks and refreshments.

Kay's Garden 
An exhibit recreating a traditional japanese garden with a koi pond, honouring Kansas Chief Justice Kay McFarland, opened in 2020.

Successful births
 Reticulated giraffe, Konza, 2018
 Reticulated giraffe, Hope, 2011
 Nile River hippopotamus, Vision, 2011
 Three banded armadillo, 2010, 2011, 2015
 Bornean orangutan, Bumi, 2013
 Golden lion tamarin, 2013 and 2014, 2015
 3 Sumatran Tiger cubs, Raza, Shanti, and ChloJo, 2014
 Hoffmann's 2-toed sloth, 2014, 2015 - They have a history of successfully breeding sloths
 Greater Malayan Chevrotain, 2014, 2015 - One of 9 AZA zoos in the US to house this species in 2015.

Incidents

One orangutan died in 2003 of tularemia, an infectious disease carried by rabbits and some rodents but sometimes found in humans and primates. A dead rabbit was found outside of their enclosure and officials think all three primates handled the rabbit before the five orangutans took ill. In reaction, the zoo has installed a rabbit-proof fence around the orangutan area.

On May 6, 2010, a bobcat in the zoo escaped its cage after a vandal apparently pried the animal's cage open. The bobcat was found several hours later in some bushes not far from its cage, and was tranquilized and returned to its cage without further incident.

On April 20, 2019, a Sumatran tiger attacked its keeper in its exhibit, causing the keeper to need surgery.

Notes

External links

Friends of the Topeka Zoo
Topeka Capital-Journal - Topeka Zoo articles

Zoos in Kansas
Buildings and structures in Topeka, Kansas
Tourist attractions in Topeka, Kansas
Zoos established in 1933